Alexandra Zvorigina (born January 7, 1991) is a Russian-born former competitive ice dancer who competed for Poland with partner Maciej Bernadowski. Together, they are three-time (2011–2013) Polish national champions.

Programs 
(with Bernadowski)

Results 
(with Bernadowski)

References

External links 

 

Polish female ice dancers
Russian female ice dancers
1991 births
Living people
People from Glazov